Centenary is an unincorporated community in Clinton Township, Vermillion County, in the U.S. state of Indiana.

History
The town was laid out in 1910 and may have been named for a local church.

Geography
Centenary is located at  (39.658530, -87.473210).

References

Unincorporated communities in Vermillion County, Indiana
Unincorporated communities in Indiana
Terre Haute metropolitan area